The 2011 ICF Canoe Sprint World Championships was the thirty-ninth edition of the ICF Canoe Sprint World Championships, that took place between 17 and 21 August 2011 in Szeged, Hungary. The Southern Hungarian city welcomed the world event for the third time, having hosted the championship previously in 1998 and 2006. These championships were awarded initially to Vichy, France, however, the race course on the Allier proved to be inadequate to hold the competition and the French Canoe Federation withdraw from organizing the event, following that Szeged, the original host of the 2013 ICF Canoe Sprint World Championships, was moved up to 2011.

Originally 94 nations have indicated their intention to participate on the championship, from them 88 registered officially for the competition, which was the main qualification event for the 2012 Summer Olympics, since 176 of the 248 Olympic quotas were distributed in this fixture.

Germany and Russia topped the overall medal count with 11 medals each, and the Central European country won also the tied-most gold medals together with Hungary. The joy of the Germans was only overshadowed by an anthem mishap, as for their first gold medalists, Anne Knorr and Debora Niche the first verse of the national hymn was played, which is associated with the crimes of the Nazis and is not used since 1952. The organizers asked to be excused, which the head of the German Canoe Federation accepted, assuming no intent. Azerbaijani trio Sergiy Bezugliy, Maksim Prokopenko and Valentin Demyanenko collected three medals each in the men's events, while Max Hoff of Germany became the winningest canoeist with two World Championships titles. In the women's competition Hungary's Danuta Kozák was the most successful racer with two gold and a silver medal. Kozák's partner in K-2, Katalin Kovács claimed her thirty-ninth and fortieth World Championship medal and surpassed Birgit Fischer's record of 38.

Venue
The races were held in the Maty-ér, also known as the National Kayak-Canoe and Rowing Olympic Centre, an artificial reservoir which is situated two kilometres south of Szeged. It consist a 2400 metres long and 122 metres wide race track with nine lanes and a warm-up course, and is equipped with an automatic starting system and an electric time keeper with photo finish camera to meet all the criteria of the International Canoe Federation.

In preparation for the championship, the facilities of the Maty-ér were upgraded to become a state of the art sports complex. The Hungarian government allocated 450 million HUF (approximately $2.4 million) for the procedure, in which the whole sports center became accessible for disabled people, what was an important factor, since paracanoeists also participate in the competition. There was also constructed an 11,000-seat tribune, and the VIP-building together with the finish tower was also redeveloped. New racks were installed as well to be able to store the increased number of boats, and new catamarans were put into operation to assist the smooth conduct of the competition. Moreover, LED displays were erected on the island that divides the race course and the warm-up area, and two 36-meter-high cranes were set up, which hold and move the spidercams above the water. The complete refurbishment was finished and the facilities were delivered on 9 August 2011, eight days prior to the beginning of the championship.

Preliminaries to the event

Host selection
In October 2007, on the congress meeting of the International Canoe Federation in Guatemala City the organization rights of the World Championships were given to Vichy, beating the bids of Athens and Szeged. The regatta course in Vichy is on a natural river, which quality is highly influenced by the weather conditions. On the 2010 World Cup events a heavy water flow was experienced on the Allier River making the racing unequal. A number of competitors, including Olympic medalists Josefa Idem and Ken Wallace expressed their concerns and dissatisfaction with the track, following that the International Canoe Federation had to reconsider its decision. In early July, after a deep analysis of the situation, being aware of the possible inequity and unfairness on a major Olympic qualification event, the French Canoe Federation with the consent of the International Canoe Federation desisted from organizing the event. On 25 July 2010 the executive committee of the International Canoe Federation awarded the vacant place in its meeting in Lausanne to Szeged, which came second behind Vichy in the official candidating process, and was originally scheduled to host of the 2013 ICF Canoe Sprint World Championships.

Sponsorships
The naming sponsor of the event is the petrolchemical concern MOL Group, which actively supports sports in Hungary since years, having a prominent role in ice hockey, fencing, tennis and canoeing. MOL was the main sponsor of the 2006 ICF World Championships and for years it has been the naming sponsor of the MOL World Cup, which is one of the most acknowledged regattas in the world. The official supplier of the championship is SEAT, while Magyar Telekom enters the sponsors' list as the exclusive telecommunications partner. They are present in the competition with a wide range of services, such as LAN, WLAN, 3G and IPTV, providing internet terminals for the usage. Allee Center hosts the related official events, press conferences and promotional programs. Among the media partners are a number of online and offline newspapers (Délmagyarország, Figyelő, Index.hu, IPM, Nemzeti Sport, Szabad Föld) as well as radio stations, including regional transmitter Rádió 88 and nationwide broadcasters Rádió 1 and mr1-Kossuth Rádió. Other sponsors are EDF DÉMÁSZ, ESMA Group, Hunguest Hotels, MKB Bank, Rauch, RiverRide, Theodora, Volán and Weltauto.

Coverage
The media coverage was directed by the Hungarian Television and was taken over by 80 broadcasters, including ARD, rbb, BBC, RAI and global sports channel Eurosport. Live streaming on the official website of the event was also available. The World Championships were the first ever canoeing event, where the spidercam was used, giving a three-dimensional view of the course and making the races more lively for television viewers. 420 accredited press members were present throughout the competition, among others from Associated Press (AP), Agence France-Presse (AFP), Reuters and Deutsche Presse-Agentur (DPA). The event organizers also had a pioneer role in using social media tools such as Facebook, Twitter and blogs to extend the event's reach. Live results were provided by Sportline Ltd and could be reached from the official site of the event. Ovi came out with a free mobile application called Canoe 2011, with that one could be continuously informed about the results and the latest news, both in English and Hungarian.

José Perurena, president of the International Canoe Federation expressed his satisfaction with the coverage on the closing press conference of the event, having emphasized the records that were set in the World Championship: "I'm absolutely content. The finals over the weekend took place in front of a crowd of 15,000 people, and more than 400 correspondents reported from the event, both are record numbers in the history of canoeing." Perurena also highlighted the innovative technologies that debuted on the competition and made the broadcast more enjoyable. His view was shared by Italian Canoe Federation president Luciano Buonfiglio, who stated that "for the member countries of the international federation, Szeged has been a very good occasion, in the best way, to showcase our sport on the international stage. Hungarian television production was really fantastic."

Explanation of events
Canoe sprint competitions are broken up into Canadian canoe (C), an open canoe with a single-blade paddle, or in kayaks (K), a closed canoe with a double-bladed paddle. Each canoe or kayak can hold one person (1), two people (2), or four people (4). When a competition is listed as a C-2 500 m event as an example, it means two people are in a canoe competing at a  distance.

Paracanoeist race in the traditional kayak (K) discipline and in va'a (V), which is canoe with an outrigger, that helps the canoeist to poise the boat. The contenders are divided into three classes according to the level of their disability. Participants in LTA category have functional use of their legs, trunk and arms for paddling, and they can apply force to the footboard to propel the boat. TA class paddlers have functional use of the trunk and arms, but they are unable to apply continuous and controlled force to the footboard to propel the boat due to the weakened function of their lower limbs. Canoeist who have no trunk function are classified in the A category. At the World Championships 200 metres single events were organized for both genders in both disciplines in every disability class, however, a minimum of six competing national federations for each category were required in order to be a valid championship.

Participating nations
88 countries have entered athletes.

 Algeria (3)
 Angola (3)
 Argentina (12)
 Armenia (5)
 Australia (29)
 Austria (4)
 Azerbaijan (8)
 Belarus (26)
 Belgium (7)
 Brazil (19)
 Bulgaria (14)
 Cambodia (1)
 Canada (40)
 Chile (6)
 China (24)
 Chinese Taipei (1)
 Colombia (5)
 Cook Islands (2)
 Croatia (2)
 Cuba (9)
 Cyprus (1)
 Czech Republic (21)
 Denmark (9)
 Ecuador (4)
 Egypt (1)
 Estonia (1)
 Finland (6)
 France (18)
 Georgia (2)
 Germany (31)
 Ghana (8)
 Great Britain (23)
 Greece (4)
 Hong Kong (7)
 Hungary (49)
 India (29)
 Indonesia (19)
 Iran (11)
 Iraq (3)
 Ireland (4)
 Israel (2)
 Italy (37)
 Japan (8)
 Kazakhstan (12)
 Kenya (3)
 Kyrgyzstan (6)
 Latvia (14)
 Lithuania (14)
 Luxembourg (3)
 Malaysia (1)
 Malta (2)
 Mexico (12)
 Moldova (5)
 Montenegro (1)
 Morocco (2)
 Myanmar (2)
 Netherlands (5)
 New Zealand (11)
 Norway (7)
 Poland (34)
 Portugal (12)
 Puerto Rico (1)
 Romania (27)
 Russia (44)
 Samoa (1)
 São Tomé and Príncipe (2)
 Senegal (2)
 Serbia (22)
 Seychelles (2)
 Singapore (10)
 Slovakia (18)
 Slovenia (6)
 South Africa (9)
 South Korea (12)
 Spain (41)
 Sri Lanka (1)
 Sweden (21)
 Switzerland (5)
 Tajikistan (1)
 Thailand (1)
 Tunisia (4)
 Turkey (3)
 Ukraine (40)
 United States (28)
 Uruguay (1)
 Uzbekistan (12)
 Venezuela (7)
 Vietnam (2)

Medal summary

Men's
 Non-Olympic classes

Canoe

Kayak

Women's
 Non-Olympic classes

Canoe

Kayak

Paracanoe

Medals table

Canoe

Paracanoe

Overall

References

2011 World Championships, ICF – accessed 21 August 2010.
International Canoe Federation provisional calendar for 2009–11, including the 2011 championships. – accessed 8 August 2008.

External links

Canoe Sprint World Championships
ICF Canoe Sprint World Championships
2011
ICF Canoe Sprint World Championships
Canoeing in Hungary